Qafë Thanë is a mountain pass on the shores of Lake Ohrid in Albania. It is located in the southeastern Albanian mountains, close to the border between Albania and North Macedonia. The border crossing point between the two countries is also named Qafë Thanë, and is a "primary gateway" between the two countries.

References 

Mountain passes of Albania
Albania–North Macedonia border crossings